

From 1,000 to 1,999 

 1000 Piazzia
 1001 Gaussia
 1002 Olbersia
 1003 Lilofee
 1004 Belopolskya
 1005 Arago
 1006 Lagrangea
 1007 Pawlowia
 1008 La Paz
 1009 Sirene
 1010 Marlene
 1011 Laodamia
 1012 Sarema
 1013 Tombecka
 1014 Semphyra
 1015 Christa
 1016 Anitra
 1017 Jacqueline
 1018 Arnolda
 1019 Strackea
 1020 Arcadia
 1021 Flammario
 1022 Olympiada
 1023 Thomana
 1024 Hale
 1025 Riema
 1026 Ingrid
 1027 Aesculapia
 1028 Lydina
 1029 La Plata
 1030 Vitja
 1031 Arctica
 1032 Pafuri
 1033 Simona
 1034 Mozartia
 1035 Amata
 1036 Ganymed
 1037 Davidweilla
 1038 Tuckia
 1039 Sonneberga
 1040 Klumpkea
 1041 Asta
 1042 Amazone
 1043 Beate
 1044 Teutonia
 1045 Michela
 1046 Edwin
 1047 Geisha
 1048 Feodosia
 1049 Gotho
 1050 Meta
 1051 Merope
 1052 Belgica
 1053 Vigdis
 1054 Forsytia
 1055 Tynka
 1056 Azalea
 1057 Wanda
 1058 Grubba
 1059 Mussorgskia
 1060 Magnolia
 1061 Paeonia
 1062 Ljuba
 1063 Aquilegia
 1064 Aethusa
 1065 Amundsenia
 1066 Lobelia
 1067 Lunaria
 1068 Nofretete
 1069 Planckia
 1070 Tunica
 1071 Brita
 1072 Malva
 1073 Gellivara
 1074 Beljawskya
 1075 Helina
 1076 Viola
 1077 Campanula
 1078 Mentha
 1079 Mimosa
 1080 Orchis
 1081 Reseda
 1082 Pirola
 1083 Salvia
 1084 Tamariwa
 1085 Amaryllis
 1086 Nata
 1087 Arabis
 1088 Mitaka
 1089 Tama
 
 1091 Spiraea
 1092 Lilium
 1093 Freda
 1094 Siberia
 1095 Tulipa
 1096 Reunerta
 1097 Vicia
 1098 Hakone
 1099 Figneria
 1100 Arnica
 1101 Clematis
 1102 Pepita
 1103 Sequoia
 1104 Syringa
 1105 Fragaria
 1106 Cydonia
 1107 Lictoria
 1108 Demeter
 1109 Tata
 1110 Jaroslawa
 1111 Reinmuthia
 1112 Polonia
 1113 Katja
 1114 Lorraine
 1115 Sabauda
 1116 Catriona
 1117 Reginita
 1118 Hanskya
 1119 Euboea
 1120 Cannonia
 1121 Natascha
 1122 Neith
 1123 Shapleya
 1124 Stroobantia
 1125 China
 1126 Otero
 1127 Mimi
 1128 Astrid
 1129 Neujmina
 1130 Skuld
 1131 Porzia
 1132 Hollandia
 1133 Lugduna
 1134 Kepler
 1135 Colchis
 1136 Mercedes
 1137 Raïssa
 1138 Attica
 1139 Atami
 1140 Crimea
 1141 Bohmia
 1142 Aetolia
 1143 Odysseus
 1144 Oda
 1145 Robelmonte
 1146 Biarmia
 1147 Stavropolis
 1148 Rarahu
 1149 Volga
 1150 Achaia
 1151 Ithaka
 1152 Pawona
 1153 Wallenbergia
 1154 Astronomia
 1155 Aënna
 1156 Kira
 1157 Arabia
 1158 Luda
 1159 Granada
 1160 Illyria
 1161 Thessalia
 1162 Larissa
 1163 Saga
 1164 Kobolda
 1165 Imprinetta
 1166 Sakuntala
 1167 Dubiago
 1168 Brandia
 1169 Alwine
 1170 Siva
 1171 Rusthawelia
 1172 Äneas
 1173 Anchises
 1174 Marmara
 1175 Margo
 1176 Lucidor
 1177 Gonnessia
 1178 Irmela
 1179 Mally
 1180 Rita
 1181 Lilith
 1182 Ilona
 1183 Jutta
 1184 Gaea
 1185 Nikko
 1186 Turnera
 1187 Afra
 1188 Gothlandia
 1189 Terentia
 1190 Pelagia
 1191 Alfaterna
 1192 Prisma
 1193 Africa
 1194 Aletta
 1195 Orangia
 1196 Sheba
 1197 Rhodesia
 1198 Atlantis
 1199 Geldonia
 1200 Imperatrix
 
 1202 Marina
 1203 Nanna
 1204 Renzia
 1205 Ebella
 1206 Numerowia
 1207 Ostenia
 1208 Troilus
 1209 Pumma
 
 
 1212 Francette
 1213 Algeria
 1214 Richilde
 1215 Boyer
 1216 Askania
 1217 Maximiliana
 1218 Aster
 1219 Britta
 1220 Crocus
 1221 Amor
 1222 Tina
 1223 Neckar
 
 1225 Ariane
 1226 Golia
 1227 Geranium
 
 1229 Tilia
 1230 Riceia
 1231 Auricula
 1232 Cortusa
 1233 Kobresia
 1234 Elyna
 1235 Schorria
 1236 Thaïs
 1237 Geneviève
 1238 Predappia
 1239 Queteleta
 1240 Centenaria
 1241 Dysona
 1242 Zambesia
 1243 Pamela
 1244 Deira
 1245 Calvinia
 1246 Chaka
 1247 Memoria
 1248 Jugurtha
 1249 Rutherfordia
 1250 Galanthus
 1251 Hedera
 1252 Celestia
 1253 Frisia
 
 1255 Schilowa
 1256 Normannia
 1257 Móra
 1258 Sicilia
 1259 Ógyalla
 
 1261 Legia
 1262 Sniadeckia
 1263 Varsavia
 1264 Letaba
 
 1266 Tone
 1267 Geertruida
 1268 Libya
 1269 Rollandia
 1270 Datura
 1271 Isergina
 1272 Gefion
 
 1274 Delportia
 1275 Cimbria
 1276 Ucclia
 1277 Dolores
 
 
 1280 Baillauda
 1281 Jeanne
 1282 Utopia
 1283 Komsomolia
 1284 Latvia
 
 1286 Banachiewicza
 1287 Lorcia
 
 1289 Kutaïssi
 
 1291 Phryne
 
 1293 Sonja
 1294 Antwerpia
 1295 Deflotte
 1296 Andrée
 1297 Quadea
 1298 Nocturna
 1299 Mertona
 1300 Marcelle
 1301 Yvonne
 1302 Werra
 1303 Luthera
 1304 Arosa
 1305 Pongola
 1306 Scythia
 1307 Cimmeria
 1308 Halleria
 1309 Hyperborea
 1310 Villigera
 
 1312 Vassar
 1313 Berna
 
 
 1316 Kasan
 
 1318 Nerina
 1319 Disa
 
 
 1322 Coppernicus
 1323 Tugela
 
 1325 Inanda
 
 
 1328 Devota
 1329 Eliane
 1330 Spiridonia
 
 1332 Marconia
 1333 Cevenola
 1334 Lundmarka
 1335 Demoulina
 1336 Zeelandia
 1337 Gerarda
 1338 Duponta
 1339 Désagneauxa
 1340 Yvette
 1341 Edmée
 
 
 
 1345 Potomac
 1346 Gotha
 1347 Patria
 
 1349 Bechuana
 1350 Rosselia
 
 
 1353 Maartje
 1354 Botha
 1355 Magoeba
 1356 Nyanza
 
 
 1359 Prieska
 
 1361 Leuschneria
 1362 Griqua
 
 1364 Safara
 1365 Henyey
 1366 Piccolo
 
 1368 Numidia
 1369 Ostanina
 1370 Hella
 
 1372 Haremari
 1373 Cincinnati
 1374 Isora
 
 1376 Michelle
 
 1378 Leonce
 1379 Lomonosowa
 1380 Volodia
 
 1382 Gerti
 1383 Limburgia
 1384 Kniertje
 
 
 
 1388 Aphrodite
 1389 Onnie
 1390 Abastumani
 1391 Carelia
 1392 Pierre
 1393 Sofala
 1394 Algoa
 
 
 1397 Umtata
 
 
 1400 Tirela
 
 
 
 1404 Ajax
 1405 Sibelius
 
 1407 Lindelöf
 
 1409 Isko
 1410 Margret
 1411 Brauna
 1412 Lagrula
 
 1414 Jérôme
 
 1416 Renauxa
 
 
 1419 Danzig
 
 1421 Esperanto
 1422 Strömgrenia
 1423 Jose
 1424 Sundmania
 1425 Tuorla
 1426 Riviera
 
 1428 Mombasa
 1429 Pemba
 1430 Somalia
 1431 Luanda
 
 1433 Geramtina
 1434 Margot
 
 1436 Salonta
 1437 Diomedes
 
 1439 Vogtia
 
 1441 Bolyai
 
 1443 Ruppina
 1444 Pannonia
 
 1446 Sillanpää
 1447 Utra
 
 1449 Virtanen
 1450 Raimonda
 1451 Granö
 1452 Hunnia
 1453 Fennia
 
 1455 Mitchella
 
 1457 Ankara
 
 1459 Magnya
 1460 Haltia
 1461 Jean-Jacques
 1462 Zamenhof
 
 
 
 1466 Mündleria
 1467 Mashona
 1468 Zomba
 1469 Linzia
 1470 Carla
 
 
 1473 Ounas
 1474 Beira
 
 
 1477 Bonsdorffia
 1478 Vihuri
 1479 Inkeri
 
 1481 Tübingia
 
 
 1484 Postrema
 
 1486 Marilyn
 
 
 
 1490 Limpopo
 
 
 1493 Sigrid
 1494 Savo
 
 1496 Turku
 
 
 1499 Pori
 1500 Jyväskylä
 
 
 1503 Kuopio
 1504 Lappeenranta
 1505 Koranna
 1506 Xosa
 
 1508 Kemi
 1509 Esclangona
 1510 Charlois
 1511 Daléra
 1512 Oulu
 1513 Mátra
 1514 Ricouxa
 
 1516 Henry
 1517 Beograd
 1518 Rovaniemi
 
 1520 Imatra
 1521 Seinäjoki
 1522 Kokkola
 1523 Pieksämäki
 1524 Joensuu
 1525 Savonlinna
 
 1527 Malmquista
 
 1529 Oterma
 1530 Rantaseppä
 
 1532 Inari
 1533 Saimaa
 1534 Näsi
 1535 Päijänne
 1536 Pielinen
 1537 Transylvania
 
 
 1540 Kevola
 1541 Estonia
 1542 Schalén
 1543 Bourgeois
 1544 Vinterhansenia
 1545 Thernöe
 1546 Izsák
 
 
 
 1550 Tito
 1551 Argelander
 1552 Bessel
 1553 Bauersfelda
 1554 Yugoslavia
 1555 Dejan
 1556 Wingolfia
 
 1558 Järnefelt
 1559 Kustaanheimo
 
 
 
 1563 Noël
 1564 Srbija
 1565 Lemaître
 1566 Icarus
 1567 Alikoski
 1568 Aisleen
 1569 Evita
 1570 Brunonia
 
 
 1573 Väisälä
 1574 Meyer
 1575 Winifred
 1576 Fabiola
 
 1578 Kirkwood
 
 1580 Betulia
 1581 Abanderada
 1582 Martir
 1583 Antilochus
 
 1585 Union
 
 
 1588 Descamisada
 1589 Fanatica
 1590 Tsiolkovskaja
 
 
 
 
 
 
 1597 Laugier
 
 
 1600 Vyssotsky
 
 1602 Indiana
 
 1604 Tombaugh
 1605 Milankovitch
 
 1607 Mavis
 1608 Muñoz
 1609 Brenda
 
 1611 Beyer
 
 
 
 1615 Bardwell
 
 1617 Alschmitt
 
 1619 Ueta
 1620 Geographos
 1621 Druzhba
 1622 Chacornac
 1623 Vivian
 
 1625 The NORC
 1626 Sadeya
 1627 Ivar
 1628 Strobel
 
 
 1631 Kopff
 1632 Sieböhme
 1633 Chimay
 
 1635 Bohrmann
 
 1637 Swings
 
 
 
 
 
 
 1644 Rafita
 
 1646 Rosseland
 1647 Menelaus
 1648 Shajna
 
 1650 Heckmann
 1651 Behrens
 1652 Hergé
 
 
 1655 Comas Solà
 1656 Suomi
 1657 Roemera
 1658 Innes
 1659 Punkaharju
 1660 Wood
 1661 Granule
 
 1663 van den Bos
 
 1665 Gaby
 
 
 
 1669 Dagmar
 
 1671 Chaika
 1672 Gezelle
 
 
 1675 Simonida
 
 1677 Tycho Brahe
 
 
 1680 Per Brahe
 1681 Steinmetz
 1682 Karel
 1683 Castafiore
 1684 Iguassú
 1685 Toro
 
 1687 Glarona
 1688 Wilkens
 1689 Floris-Jan
 1690 Mayrhofer
 1691 Oort
 1692 Subbotina
 1693 Hertzsprung
 1694 Kaiser
 1695 Walbeck
 1696 Nurmela
 
 
 
 1700 Zvezdara
 
 
 1703 Barry
 1704 Wachmann
 
 
 1707 Chantal
 1708 Pólit
 1709 Ukraina
 1710 Gothard
 1711 Sandrine
 1712 Angola
 1713 Bancilhon
 1714 Sy
 
 
 1717 Arlon
 
 1719 Jens
 1720 Niels
 1721 Wells
 1722 Goffin
 
 1724 Vladimir
 
 1726 Hoffmeister
 1727 Mette
 1728 Goethe Link
 1729 Beryl
 
 1731 Smuts
 1732 Heike
 
 1734 Zhongolovich
 1735 ITA
 1736 Floirac
 1737 Severny
 
 1739 Meyermann
 1740 Paavo Nurmi
 1741 Giclas
 
 1743 Schmidt
 
 
 1746 Brouwer
 1747 Wright
 1748 Mauderli
 1749 Telamon
 1750 Eckert
 1751 Herget
 
 1753 Mieke
 1754 Cunningham
 1755 Lorbach
 
 1757 Porvoo
 
 1759 Kienle
 1760 Sandra
 1761 Edmondson
 1762 Russell
 1763 Williams
 1764 Cogshall
 1765 Wrubel
 1766 Slipher
 1767 Lampland
 1768 Appenzella
 
 
 1771 Makover
 1772 Gagarin
 
 
 1775 Zimmerwald
 1776 Kuiper
 1777 Gehrels
 1778 Alfvén
 1779 Paraná
 1780 Kippes
 1781 Van Biesbroeck
 
 1783 Albitskij
 1784 Benguella
 
 
 
 1788 Kiess
 1789 Dobrovolsky
 1790 Volkov
 1791 Patsayev
 
 1793 Zoya
 
 
 1796 Riga
 
 1798 Watts
 1799 Koussevitzky
 1800 Aguilar
 1801 Titicaca
 
 1803 Zwicky
 1804 Chebotarev
 1805 Dirikis
 1806 Derice
 1807 Slovakia
 
 1809 Prometheus
 1810 Epimetheus
 
 
 
 
 1815 Beethoven
 
 1817 Katanga
 1818 Brahms
 
 
 
 1822 Waterman
 1823 Gliese
 1824 Haworth
 1825 Klare
 1826 Miller
 1827 Atkinson
 
 
 1830 Pogson
 1831 Nicholson
 1832 Mrkos
 
 1834 Palach
 1835 Gajdariya
 1836 Komarov
 1837 Osita
 
 
 1840 Hus
 1841 Masaryk
 1842 Hynek
 
 1844 Susilva
 1845 Helewalda
 1846 Bengt
 1847 Stobbe
 1848 Delvaux
 1849 Kresák
 1850 Kohoutek
 1851 Lacroute
 1852 Carpenter
 1853 McElroy
 1854 Skvortsov
 1855 Korolev
 1856 Růžena
 1857 Parchomenko
 1858 Lobachevskij
 1859 Kovalevskaya
 
 1861 Komenský
 1862 Apollo
 1863 Antinous
 1864 Daedalus
 1865 Cerberus
 1866 Sisyphus
 1867 Deiphobus
 1868 Thersites
 1869 Philoctetes
 1870 Glaukos
 
 
 1873 Agenor
 
 
 
 1877 Marsden
 
 1879 Broederstroom
 
 1881 Shao
 
 
 
 
 
 1887 Virton
 
 1889 Pakhmutova
 
 
 
 
 
 
 
 1897 Hind
 
 
 1900 Katyusha
 
 1902 Shaposhnikov
 
 1904 Massevitch
 1905 Ambartsumian
 1906 Naef
 1907 Rudneva
 
 1909 Alekhin
 1910 Mikhailov
 1911 Schubart
 1912 Anubis
 
 
 1915 Quetzálcoatl
 1916 Boreas
 1917 Cuyo
 1918 Aiguillon
 1919 Clemence
 
 1921 Pala
 1922 Zulu
 1923 Osiris
 1924 Horus
 1925 Franklin-Adams
 
 1927 Suvanto
 1928 Summa
 1929 Kollaa
 1930 Lucifer
 1931 Čapek
 
 1933 Tinchen
 
 
 1936 Lugano
 
 1938 Lausanna
 1939 Loretta
 1940 Whipple
 1941 Wild
 
 1943 Anteros
 1944 Günter
 
 1946 Walraven
 1947 Iso-Heikkilä
 
 
 
 1951 Lick
 1952 Hesburgh
 1953 Rupertwildt
 1954 Kukarkin
 1955 McMath
 1956 Artek
 1957 Angara
 1958 Chandra
 
 1960 Guisan
 1961 Dufour
 
 
 
 1965 van de Kamp
 
 1967 Menzel
 
 
 
 1971 Hagihara
 
 
 
 
 
 1977 Shura
 
 1979 Sakharov
 1980 Tezcatlipoca
 1981 Midas
 1982 Cline
 1983 Bok
 
 1985 Hopmann
 
 1987 Kaplan
 1988 Delores
 1989 Tatry
 1990 Pilcher
 1991 Darwin
 1992 Galvarino
 
 1994 Shane
 1995 Hajek
 1996 Adams
 1997 Leverrier
 1998 Titius
 1999 Hirayama

See also 
 List of minor planet discoverers
 List of observatory codes

References

External links 
 Discovery Circumstances: Numbered Minor Planets, Minor Planet Center

Lists of minor planets by name